Koptevo may refer to:
Koptevo District, a district of Northern Administrative Okrug, Moscow, Russia
Koptevo (Moscow Central Circle), a station on the Moscow Central Circle, Russia